Belville Robert Pepper (1850 – 1888) was a bass-baritone known for creating the role of the Usher in the first production of Trial by Jury in 1875 at the Royalty Theatre in London.

Life and career
Pepper was born in Marylebone, London in 1850, the youngest of three children born to Sarah née Carden (1824–1869) and Montague Pepper (1821–1854), a carver and gilder. Following his father's death in 1854, Pepper was sent as a boarder or "inmate" in the St Marylebone Parochial Schools.

Pepper was a professional vocalist in the early 1870s and toured with a company in Great Yarmouth in 1870. After creating the role of Usher in Trial by Jury at the Royalty Theatre in London in March 1875, he was switched first to the role of Foreman and then to the non-singing role of the Associate in April 1875. At the same time Pepper was playing the small roles of the Usher and the Second Notary in Offenbach's La Perichole, which was the main attraction that Trial by Jury was supporting at the Royalty, and he also played the Porter in The Secret, a farce on the same bill during the run. Pepper appears to have left the Royalty in June 1875.

On 11 September 1877 Pepper married dancer Elizabeth Mary Wilkinson (born 1856) at St. John's church in Manchester. From March to August 1878 he was sharing the role of the Foreman in Trial by Jury, in a touring company managed by D'Oyly Carte, as part of the first touring production of The Sorcerer. In 1881 Pepper and his wife, by then an actress, were appearing in Newcastle upon Tyne, and in 1882 he sang the role of Vanderprout in a touring production of Offenbach's Geneviève de Brabant.

Little is known of Pepper's later life or career until his death in Islington in London in 1888 at the age of 38.

References

1850 births
1888 deaths
People from Marylebone
English bass-baritones
Male actors from London
Operatic bass-baritones
19th-century British male opera singers